Shoreditch station may refer to:

Shoreditch High Street railway station
Shoreditch railway station (closed in 1940)
Shoreditch tube station (closed in 2006)